Stare Misto (Stari Pidhaytsi) is a village (selo) in Ternopil Raion, Ternopil Oblast. It lies on the River Koropets. Local government – Staromiska village council. It belongs to Pidhaitsi urban hromada, one of the hromadas of Ukraine.  To her subordinated villages Holendra and Zahaytsi. Pop. 1,107.

History
According to the chronicles of the church in the territory of the village Stare Misto in the 14th century there was a settlement with the church.
The first written mention of Pidhaytsi is written in the 1st volume of the collection of the medieval documents  in 1397.

The territory of the settlement repeatedly has undergone to frequent attacks by foreign invaders. Are known attacks of Tatars in 1516, 1620, 1621, 1633, respectively, of the Polish nobility in the 1618, of Cossacks in 1648, 1653, 1655, respectively. 
There was a battle between the forces of  Peter Doroshenko and Jan Sobieski in the fields near Stare Misto in 1667.
Even today, one can find traces of defensive walls and signs fires.

Stari Pidhaitsi was renamed into Stare Misto in 1469.

When the Stare Misto came under the Austrian power, it was already quite restored, having 116 houses in 1785.

The Village was highly developed in the 19th century, especially  after the abolition of  serfdom in 1848. “Prosvita”, “Sich”, “Ridna Shkola” and other societies were established in the early 20th-century. The slogans of the new-created Ukrainian National Democratic Party promoted the development of populations national consciousness.

Prior to 1990, Stare Misto belonged to Berezhany Raion
Until 18 July 2020, Stare Misto belonged to Pidhaitsi Raion. The raion was abolished in July 2020 as part of the administrative reform of Ukraine, which reduced the number of raions of Ternopil Oblast to three. The area of Pidhaitsi Raion was merged into Ternopil Raion.

Attractions
 Church of the Intercession (1854 wood)
 Church of St. George (1931, stone)
 Chapel of St. Pokrova (1995)
 "Figure" of Jesus Christ (1991) and St. Anna (1992)

Gallery

References

External links
weather.in.ua

Literature

Śladem przodków. Podhajce. Grzegorz Gołębiowski 

Stare Misto